Vivian Wong Shir Yee is a Malaysian politician who has served as the Member of Parliament (MP) for Sandakan since May 2019. She is a member of the Democratic Action Party (DAP), a component party of the Pakatan Harapan (PH) opposition coalition.

Background
Vivian was born and raised in Sandakan, Sabah. She is the youngest child of Datuk Stephen Wong Tien Fatt, the former MP for the Sandakan (2013–2019) and Minister of People's Health and Wellbeing of Sabah (2018–2019). She has been an active member in DAP alongside her father since 2012 and previously worked as a special assistant to her father in his ministry. Vivian has been a financial consultant in Kuala Lumpur and a teacher at the International Korean School of Malaysia in Cyberjaya. She also has been an activist and has volunteered for welfare programmes in countries including Indonesia and Cambodia. She is a graduate with a Diploma of Communication and Media from INTI College Subang Jaya in 2010 and a bachelor's degree in Public Relations from the Murdoch University of Western Australia in 2013. In 2018, she obtained a Diploma Degree of Early Childhood Education from the University of Malaya.

Political career
Vivian was elected to the Parliament of Malaysia for the Sandakan constituency in the 2019 Sandakan by-election after the seat fell vacant upon the sudden demise of her father by heart attack who was also the incumbent then. She won by 16,012 votes out of the 21,595 votes cast with a bigger majority of 11,521 votes.

Election results

References

Living people
Malaysian politicians of Chinese descent
Malaysian people of Hakka descent
Malaysian Christians
Malaysian activists
Democratic Action Party (Malaysia) politicians
Members of the Dewan Rakyat
Members of the 15th Malaysian Parliament
Women members of the Dewan Rakyat
Women in Sabah politics
Murdoch University alumni
21st-century Malaysian politicians
1989 births
21st-century Malaysian women politicians
People from Sandakan